Nicholas Herring is a Canadian writer from Murray Harbour, Prince Edward Island, whose debut novel Some Hellish was the winner of the 2022 Atwood Gibson Writers' Trust Fiction Prize.

He studied English at St. Jerome's University, and creative writing at the University of Toronto.

References

21st-century Canadian novelists
21st-century Canadian male writers
Canadian male novelists
People from Kings County, Prince Edward Island
Writers from Prince Edward Island
Living people
Year of birth missing (living people)